Cem Felek (born 12 May 1996) is a professional footballer who plays as an attacking midfielder. Born in Germany, he has represented both Turkey and Azerbaijan at youth level.

Club career

Youth career
Born in Buchen, Germany, Felek spent much of his youth career with German sides, most notably a 5-year spell with Eintracht Frankfurt. He was linked with a move to Spanish giants Barcelona in 2010, having scored over 1000 goals at youth level. In 2014, he transferred from Bochum to Scottish Premiership side Aberdeen, where he stayed for a year, making the first-team bench once in 2014 before being released in May 2015.

Fatih Karagümrük
In 2015, he was linked with a move to Turkish giants Galatasaray, but the move never materialised and Felek instead joined TFF Second League side Fatih Karagümrük in July.

Antalyaspor
In August 2015, Felek was loaned to Antalyaspor, where he featured for the Antalya-based club's 'B' team. He made his debut for Antalyaspor senior team in the Turkish Cup 1–0 away victory against Giresunspor on 21 January 2016. Felek also played in the Turkish Cup group stage match, coming on as a 74th-minute substitute for Lionel Enguene in a 0–0 home draw against Fenerbahçe on 27 January 2016.

RoPS
In January 2017, Cem Felek joined Finnish side RoPS. Felek made his Veikkausliiga debut for RoPS against VPS on 17 April 2017. He scored his first goal for RoPS in the Finnish Cup match against OPS in a 9–0 home victory on 11 February 2017.

KuPS
Felek went back to Finland for the 2019 season. The deal with KuPS was announced on 3 December 2018.

International career
Felek is eligible for Germany through his place of birth, Turkey through his parents, and Azerbaijan through his extended family. He played a single game for the Turkish under-15 side in 2010, a 3–0 victory over The Netherlands. He has represented Azerbaijan at under-17 and under-19 level. In June 2012, he helped the under-17 side win silver medals at the Caspian Cup.

Career statistics

Club

Notes

References

External links
 
 Cem Felek at TFF

1996 births
Living people
Association football forwards
People from Buchen
Sportspeople from Karlsruhe (region)
Azerbaijani footballers
Azerbaijan youth international footballers
Turkish footballers
Turkey youth international footballers
Azerbaijani people of Turkish descent
German people of Turkish descent
Azerbaijani expatriate footballers
Eintracht Frankfurt players
VfL Bochum players
Aberdeen F.C. players
Antalyaspor footballers
Rovaniemen Palloseura players
Kuopion Palloseura players
TSV Steinbach Haiger players
Aris Limassol FC players
Veikkausliiga players
Expatriate footballers in Finland
Expatriate footballers in Cyprus
Footballers from Baden-Württemberg
Expatriate footballers in Estonia
FCI Levadia Tallinn players
Meistriliiga players